Semon's leaf-nosed bat or Semon's roundleaf bat (Hipposideros semoni) is a species of bat in the family Hipposideridae.  It is found in Australia and Papua New Guinea.

Taxonomy and etymology
It was described as a new species in 1903 by German zoologist Paul Matschie. The eponym for the species name "semoni" was fellow German zoologist Richard Semon. Semon's research voyage to Australia procured the holotype that Matschie used to describe the new species.

Description
Individuals weigh . It has long, narrow ears with sharply pointed tips. Its fur is a dark, smoky gray in color, with individual hairs relatively long.

Biology and ecology
It is nocturnal, roosting in sheltered places during the day such as abandoned mines, caves, hollow trees, and rock fissures. It will roost singly or in small colonies. It is insectivorous, preying on arthropods such as spiders, beetles, and moths. It is possibly a prey species of the ghost bat, which is known to consume other bat species in the family Hipposideridae.

Conservation
It is currently evaluated as least concern by the IUCN—its lowest conservation priority. However, it has a more urgent conservation status in Australia. Queensland listed it as endangered under the Nature Conservation Act 1992, while nationally it is listed as vulnerable under the Environment Protection and Biodiversity Conservation Act 1999.
Conservation and management actions recommended in Australia include preventing roost disturbance and destruction. Additionally, there is a stated need to determine the extent of the species range in Australia, as well as to assess what its requirements are for acceptable roosts.

References

Hipposideros
Bats of Australia
Bats of Oceania
Mammals of Papua New Guinea
Mammals of Queensland
Nature Conservation Act endangered biota
EPBC Act vulnerable biota
Mammals described in 1903
Taxa named by Paul Matschie
Taxonomy articles created by Polbot
Bats of New Guinea